"" ("Aruba Sweet Land", or "Aruba Lovely Country") is the national anthem of Aruba. It is a waltz written by Juan Chabaya Lampe and composed by Rufo Wever. It was accepted as the Aruban national anthem on 18 March 1976. It is written in Papiamento.

History
On 16 January 1976, the Executive Council of Aruba appointed an advisory committee with the assignment to come up with an anthem that took into account "Aruba dushi tera". The song was already very popular among the population and dated from the early 1950s. The committee included Rufo Wever (chairman), Eddy Bennett, Maybeline Arends-Croes and Hubert (Lio) Booi. The committee advised not to alter the melody of the "old" "Aruba dushi tera" into a march but to increase the number of verses.

Lyrics

Notes

References

External links

Aruba National Anthems In The World All Countries National Anthems

National symbols of Aruba
North American anthems
Papiamento-language mass media
1976 songs
Dutch anthems
National anthems